Angela Nadine Mabanta Paredes (born April 17, 1983), professionally known as Ala Paredes, is an Australia-based Filipino environmental activist, commercial model and writer, who at various times in her career was also a TV host, VJ, advice columnist, and vocalist for Filipino alternative band Hiraya. Since moving to Australia, she has become one of the correspondents covering Australia for the Philippines' ABS-CBN News & Current Affairs.

Education and early career 
Paredes graduated from high school in 2000 at the School of the Holy Spirit (SHSQC), a private, all-girls Roman Catholic school in Quezon City. She then moved on to the Ateneo de Manila University, where she received her Bachelor of Arts in Communication in 2004.

She first ventured into modeling in her junior year in college, doing a commercial for a facial wash, and soon endorsing a clothing line.  Initially, Ala was perceived to have the advantage of a familiar family name: she is the second daughter  of singer Jim Paredes of the APO Hiking Society. But she soon became popular in her own right, taking up social causes just as her father, well known for his advocacies, did before her.
Model in Globe Telecom's TV Ad "ARE YOU ONE OF US?" early 2000

"Unconventional Beauty"
In her first forays as a television personality, doing television ads, she quickly became a recognizable figure, distinguished by her morena (malay brown) complexion and curly hair, a sharp contrast to the traditional look of models at the time. The Philippine Center for Investigative Journalism took note of her unusual success and said:
Model Ala Paredes has curly hair in a country where long, straight hair is considered the epitome of female beauty.... In an industry that prizes fair skin and straight hair, her morena skin color and loose, voluptuous curls are considered unconventional.

At around the same time, Paredes began blogging regularly, with her blog soon becoming popular and earning her a reputation as a celebrity blogger – a role she would later use to promote environmental issues.

Media work in the Philippines
Paredes' modeling career soon burgeoned into a television career. She continued modelling occasionally but became a regular VJ for ABS-CBN's music channel Myx, and then later the host of IslaMusik, a television show on ABC 5 featuring a musicians from all over the Philippines. She also often served as a presenter at numerous events. As a writer, she also became an advice columnist for Pink magazine.

Hiraya vocalist 
In 2005, Paredes became the frontwoman of a Pinoy rock band Hiraya when the original vocalist left. Guitarist Mark Verzo, bassist Marco Cuneta on bass, and drummer Paulo Tomas recruited her to become the replacement vocalist.  The band had already released an EP, with their previous vocalist, when Ala took over. She stayed with the band until a short time before she moved to Australia with her family in 2006.

Move to Australia 
In 2006, the Paredes family decided to migrate to Australia – a decision which Jim Paredes explained was related to a desire for greater personal development.  The move generated some controversy when a copyeditor for a prominent Philippine newspaper wrote a headline that said Mr. Paredes, known for his activism, was "giving up on the Philippines."  Both Jim and Ala Paredes protested that this was a miscategorization of their family's motives for moving.  The paper eventually apologized  to the Paredes family for the original, inaccurate headline of the article. Mr Paredes later said that he "felt bad not so much that people misread me as a person (that's hurtful, yes) but more so that they may slip deeper into despair by such a false story. That's the last thing we need," and Ala expressed similar sentiments.

Media work and studies 
Even after migrating to a new country, however, Ala Paredes continued to be deeply involved in things Filipino – this time, specifically the Filipino community in Australia. In the same year that the Paredeses moved to Australia, she was recruited by ABS-CBN Global, the international multi-platform media company of Filipino media giant ABS-CBN, to be a correspondent for Balitang Australia, a weekly news and feature program catering specifically to Filipino Australians.

Paredes later decided to take up an illustration course from the Sydney Design Institute, graduating in December 2009.

Ampatuan trial sketch artist 
Upon graduation, Paredes served as the official courtroom sketch artist at the trial of Andal Ampatuan Jr., the prime suspect in the Maguindanao massacre. Paredes had gone on vacation in the Philippines to spend the holidays with relatives, when a friend of hers who worked at the Supreme Court of the Philippines called about an open position for a courtroom sketch artist at the Ampatuan trial. Courtroom sketches were needed because media coverage at the trial was restricted.

Describing the moment, she said that she “immediately called my friend back 10 seconds after receiving her message and accepted the offer. We did not talk about the (pay).” Noting the importance of the case, she said that “At a time when the nation is still grieving, I feel like this is my way of getting involved,” and “I thought this is my own way of giving public service, especially when media can’t be there.”

References

1983 births
Filipino expatriates in Australia
Naturalised citizens of Australia
Filipino television personalities
Filipino female models
VJs (media personalities)
Filipino writers
Filipino women writers
Filipino bloggers
Living people
People from Manila
Ateneo de Manila University alumni
Filipino people of Basque descent
Ilocano people
Filipino women bloggers
ABS-CBN News and Current Affairs people
21st-century Filipino singers
21st-century Filipino women singers
Australian women bloggers
Australian bloggers